Renee Teppan (born 26 September 1993) is an Estonian volleyball player, a member of the Estonia men's national volleyball team and Polish club MKS Będzin.

Club career
Teppan was born in Pärnu, and started his career in hometown club Pärnu VK at the age of 17. After two seasons he moved to Bigbank Tartu and won the Estonian Championship in 2014. He then moved to abroad and signed with Italian team Altotevere Città di Castello alongside compatriot Andri Aganits. He spent the next two seasons with Hypo Tirol Innsbruck winning two Austrian Championship titles. For the 2017–18 season Teppan moved back to Italy and played for Diatec Trentino. In May 2018 he signed a two-year contract with the Polish PlusLiga top team PGE Skra Bełchatów. In his first season with the team Teppan mostly played as a substitute for the club legend Mariusz Wlazły. His first trophy with the team was the 2018 Polish SuperCup when Bełchatów defeated Trefl Gdańsk 3–0. Teppan and the team also reached the semi-finals of the 2018–19 CEV Champions League making him the second Estonian after Oliver Venno to play in the semi-finals of the Champions League. He opted out of the second year of the contract and signed with French team Stade Poitevin Poitiers for the 2018–19 season. Teppan left the team in February 2020 and signed with Noliko Maaseik of the Belgian League where he was again united with compatriot Andri Aganits. For the next season he returned to native Estonia and signed with Selver Tallinn. He helped the team win the Estonian Cup and the Baltic League title and was also named MVP of the latter tournament. Teppan started the 2021–22 season in the Turkish Men's Volleyball League playing for Tokat Belediye Plevnespor. Mid-season in January 2022 he joined with Greek top team Olympiacos Piraeus.

National team
As a member of the senior Estonia men's national volleyball team, Teppan competed at the 2015, 2017, 2019 and 2021 European Volleyball Championships. With the national team Teppan won the 2016 European Volleyball League title. He helped Estonia win their second European League title in 2018 and was named MVP of the tournament.

Sporting achievements

Clubs
MEVZA Cup
  2015/2016 – with Hypo Tirol Innsbruck
  2016/2017 – with Hypo Tirol Innsbruck

Baltic League
  2010/2011 – with Pärnu
  2011/2012 – with Pärnu
  2013/2014 – with Bigbank Tartu
  2020/2021 – with Selver Tallinn

National championship
 2010/2011  Estonian Championship, with Pärnu
 2011/2012  Estonian Championship, with Pärnu
 2013/2014  Estonian Championship, with Bigbank Tartu
 2015/2016  Austrian Championship, with Hypo Tirol Innsbruck
 2016/2017  Austrian Championship, with Hypo Tirol Innsbruck
 2020/2021  Estonian Championship, with Selver Tallinn
 2021/2022  Greek Championship, with Olympiacos Piraeus

National cup
 2010/2011  Estonian Cup, with Pärnu
 2013/2014  Estonian Cup, with Bigbank Tartu
 2018/2019  Polish SuperCup, with PGE Skra Bełchatów
 2020/2021  Estonian Cup, with Selver Tallinn

National team
 2016  European League
 2018  European League
 2018  Challenger Cup
 2021  European League

Individual
 2018 European League – Most Valuable Player
 2021 Baltic League – Most Valuable Player

References

1993 births
Living people
Estonian men's volleyball players
People from Tori Parish
Estonian expatriate sportspeople in Austria
Estonian expatriate sportspeople in Belgium
Estonian expatriate sportspeople in France
Estonian expatriate sportspeople in Italy
Estonian expatriate sportspeople in Poland
Expatriate volleyball players in Austria
Expatriate volleyball players in Belgium
Expatriate volleyball players in France
Expatriate volleyball players in Italy
Expatriate volleyball players in Poland
Estonian expatriate volleyball players
Trentino Volley players
Skra Bełchatów players
Expatriate volleyball players in Greece
Estonian expatriate sportspeople in Greece
Expatriate volleyball players in Turkey
Estonian expatriate sportspeople in Turkey